A Sabon Gari (strangers' quarters or literally new town in the Hausa language, plural Sabon Garuruwa) is a section of cities and town in Northern Nigeria South Central Niger and Northern Cameroon whose residents are not indigenous to Hausa lands.

History
Permanent communities of strangers segregated from the indigenous population had existed in Northern Nigeria and other parts of West Africa long before the arrival of the British around 1900. Although living segregated from the Hausa population, residents of these communities were ultimately subjected to the authority of the local emir. This has changed over the years as apart from Kano in Northern Nigeria, the Sabon Garis are of mixed habitation.

The establishment of British colonial rule under Lord Frederick Lugard and the construction of new railway lines led to a large influx of laborers and traders from Southern Nigeria. The immigrants, which were mostly Igbo and Yoruba people, settled in new towns or Sabon Garuruwa, as these new towns were called by the local Hausa people. The Cantonments Proclamation of 1914 institutionalized this system of residential segregation. The Sabon Garuruwa became Native Reservations, officially reserved for employees of the government and commercial firms, and in practice inhabited by residents not indigenous to Northern Nigeria.

British colonial rule in Northern Nigeria was indirect, leaving the emirs in power, albeit as part of the colonial administration. In the beginning, the Sabon Garuruwa were administrated by the emirs. This changed with the Township Ordinance of 1917, which placed the Sabon Garuruwa and their residents under direct British rule. Sabon Gari residents were granted more rights than those under the administration of the local emir. For example, residents of a Sabon Gari could send representatives to the advisory board responsible for a township, or could choose between courts administering Muslim law or British law.

Sabon Garuruwa were established in all major cities of Northern Nigeria, most notably in Kano, Kaduna and Zaria. One exception was Maiduguri, which never had a Sabon Gari. A typical city or town in Northern Nigeria would consist of the old city within fortified walls and inhabited by indigenous Hausa or Fulani people. The Sabon Gari would house immigrants mostly from Southern Nigeria. The Tudun Wada would house people from Northern Nigeria that were not indigenous to the local area. Europeans would live in the European Reservation Areas.

When General Ironsi abolished the Nigerian federation in 1966 with Decree no. 34, it led to widespread pogroms against Igbos residing in Sabon gabris in Northern Nigeria. These pogroms killed an estimated 8,000 to 30,000 Igbo, half of them children, and caused more than a million to two million to flee to the Eastern Region.

Over time, the initially strict residential segregation would partially break down. Eventually, a typical Sabon Gari would house a diversity of people from all parts of Nigeria and to a lesser extent from other parts of West Africa. For example, in 1939 various ethnic groups were represented in the Sabon Gari of Kaduna as follows: 27% were Hausa, 11% were Igbo, 19% were Yoruba, 15% were Nupe and 28% were other ethnicities.

Sabon Garuruwa Today
Even today, Sabon Garuruwa are predominantly inhabited by people from Southern Nigeria. Ethnic tensions between groups from southern and northern Nigeria lead to frequent riots in the Sabon Garuruwa of northern cities. With the introduction of Sharia law in the Northern states of Nigeria, some Sabon Garuruwa with its predominantly Christian population have become the place of officially forbidden activities like alcohol consumption, gambling and prostitution.

Zinder and Maradi, the two largest Hausa cities in Niger's Hausa speaking southeast retain Sabon Gari districts.

See also
Sabon Gari, Kaduna State

References

History of Nigeria
Geography of Nigeria
Kano
Kaduna